Hannah Arnold may refer to:
 Hannah Arnold (née Waterman) (1705–1758), mother of Benedict Arnold
 Hannah Arnold (beauty queen) (born 1996), Filipino-Australian model and beauty pageant titleholder